The arrondissement of Montmorillon is an arrondissement of France in the Vienne department in the Nouvelle-Aquitaine region. It has 91 communes.

Composition

The communes of the arrondissement of Montmorillon, and their INSEE codes, are:

 Adriers (86001)
 Anché (86003)
 Antigny (86006)
 Asnières-sur-Blour (86011)
 Asnois (86012)
 Availles-Limouzine (86015)
 Béthines (86025)
 Blanzay (86029)
 Bouresse (86034)
 Bourg-Archambault (86035)
 Brigueil-le-Chantre (86037)
 Brion (86038)
 Brux (86039)
 La Bussière (86040)
 Champagné-le-Sec (86051)
 Champagné-Saint-Hilaire (86052)
 Champniers (86054)
 La Chapelle-Bâton (86055)
 Chapelle-Viviers (86059)
 Charroux (86061)
 Chatain (86063)
 Château-Garnier (86064)
 Chaunay (86068)
 Civaux (86077)
 Civray (86078)
 Coulonges (86084)
 La Ferrière-Airoux (86097)
 Fleix (86098)
 Gençay (86103)
 Genouillé (86104)
 Gouex (86107)
 Haims (86110)
 L'Isle-Jourdain (86112)
 Jouhet (86117)
 Journet (86118)
 Joussé (86119)
 Lathus-Saint-Rémy (86120)
 Lauthiers (86122)
 Leignes-sur-Fontaine (86126)
 Lhommaizé (86131)
 Liglet (86132)
 Linazay (86134)
 Lizant (86136)
 Luchapt (86138)
 Lussac-les-Châteaux (86140)
 Magné (86141)
 Mauprévoir (86152)
 Mazerolles (86153)
 Millac (86159)
 Montmorillon (86165)
 Moulismes (86170)
 Moussac (86171)
 Mouterre-sur-Blourde (86172)
 Nalliers (86175)
 Nérignac (86176)
 Paizay-le-Sec (86187)
 Payroux (86189)
 Persac (86190)
 Pindray (86191)
 Plaisance (86192)
 Pressac (86200)
 Queaux (86203)
 Romagne (86211)
 Saint-Gaudent (86220)
 Saint-Germain (86223)
 Saint-Laurent-de-Jourdes (86228)
 Saint-Léomer (86230)
 Saint-Macoux (86231)
 Saint-Martin-l'Ars (86234)
 Saint-Maurice-la-Clouère (86235)
 Saint-Pierre-de-Maillé (86236)
 Saint-Pierre-d'Exideuil (86237)
 Saint-Romain (86242)
 Saint-Savin (86246)
 Saint-Saviol (86247)
 Saint-Secondin (86248)
 Saulgé (86254)
 Savigné (86255)
 Sillars (86262)
 Sommières-du-Clain (86264)
 Surin (86266)
 Thollet (86270)
 La Trimouille (86273)
 Usson-du-Poitou (86276)
 Valdivienne (86233)
 Valence-en-Poitou (86082)
 Verrières (86285)
 Le Vigeant (86289)
 Villemort (86291)
 Voulême (86295)
 Voulon (86296)

History

The arrondissement of Montmorillon was created in 1800. At the January 2017 reorganisation of the arrondissements of Vienne, it lost one commune to the arrondissement of Châtellerault and four communes to the arrondissement of Poitiers.

As a result of the reorganisation of the cantons of France which came into effect in 2015, the borders of the cantons are no longer related to the borders of the arrondissements. The cantons of the arrondissement of Montmorillon were, as of January 2015:

 Availles-Limouzine
 Charroux
 Chauvigny
 Civray
 Couhé
 Gençay
 L'Isle-Jourdain
 Lussac-les-Châteaux
 Montmorillon
 Saint-Savin
 La Trimouille

References

Montmorillon